Novake is a village on the left bank of the Dravinja River in the Municipality of Poljčane in northeastern Slovenia. The area belongs to the traditional region of Styria. It is now included with the rest of the municipality in the Drava Statistical Region.

References

External links
Novake on Geopedia

Populated places in the Municipality of Poljčane